Pundori Kalan is a Chatha village in Wazirabad Tehsil, Gujranwala, Punjab, Pakistan.

Villages in Gujranwala District